Every Night is an album by Saturday Looks Good to Me.  It was released on September 14, 2004 on Polyvinyl.

Track listing

The LP and CD have a few songs that feature different mixes and singers.

References

2004 albums
Saturday Looks Good to Me albums